A Question of Taste (also known as A Matter of Taste in the United States) is a 2000 French film directed by Bernard Rapp. Rapp and Gilles Taurand wrote the screenplay which was based on the book "Affaires de goût" by Philippe Balland. The film received 5 César Award nominations, including the nomination for Best Film.

Awards and nominations
César Awards (France)
Nominated: Best Actor – Leading Role (Bernard Giraudeau)
Nominated: Best Actress – Supporting Role (Florence Thomassin)
Nominated: Best Film
Nominated: Best Writing (Bernard Rapp and Gilles Taurand)
Nominated: Most Promising Actor (Jean-Pierre Lorit)
Karlovy Vary Film Festival (Czech Republic)
Won: Special Mention (Bernard Rapp)
Nominated: Crystal Globe (Bernard Rapp)

References

External links
 

2000 films
Films set in Lyon
2000s French-language films
French crime thriller films
2000s French films